Patrick Michael Byrne (born November 29, 1962) is an American businessman. In 1999, Byrne launched Overstock.com after leading two smaller companies. Byrne led Overstock as chief executive officer for two decades, from 1999 to 2019. In 2002, Byrne took Overstock public. Early in his tenure he attracted public attention for a long-running legal battle against short sellers and "naked short selling." He eventually resigned as CEO in August 2019, following revelations that he had been in an intimate relationship with Russian spy, and future politician with Vladimir Putin's United Russia party, Maria Butina.

Byrne then emerged as a leading figure in promoting conspiracy theories, including the "Deep State" conspiracy theory. In 2020 and 2021, he repeatedly promoted unevidenced claims that Donald Trump had won the 2020 U.S. presidential election due to voter fraud. He has also toured the United States in order to provide anti-vaccination stump speeches for COVID-19 conspiracy theorists. He became notable for distributing and selling misinformation on various subject matters via websites, social media, books, and film.

He has also been noted for his conservative views on public education.

Early life, education, and early business career
Byrne was born on November 29, 1962, in Fort Wayne, Indiana. He grew up in Woodstock, Vermont, and Hanover, New Hampshire. He is the son of John J. Byrne, former chairman of Berkshire Hathaway's GEICO insurance subsidiary and White Mountains Insurance Group. His father was a friend of Warren Buffett, the leader of Berkshire Hathaway. 
 
Byrne holds a certificate from Beijing Normal University, has a Bachelor of Arts degree in Chinese studies from Dartmouth College, a master's degree from King's College, Cambridge as a Marshall Scholar, and a Ph.D. in philosophy from Stanford University.

Byrne was a teaching fellow at Stanford University from 1989 to 1991 and was manager of Blackhawk Investment Co. and Elissar, Inc. He served as chairman, president and CEO of Centricut, LLC, a manufacturer of industrial torches, then held the same three positions at Fechheimer Brothers, Inc., a Berkshire Hathaway company that manufactured uniforms for the police, firefighters, and the military.

Overstock.com

Career and tenure as CEO
In 1999, after leading two smaller companies, Byrne was approached by the founder of D2-Discounts Direct with a request for operating capital. The company had generated slightly more than $500,000 in revenue the previous year by liquidating excess furniture inventory online. Byrne found the idea of online closeouts intriguing, and invested $7 million for a 60 percent equity stake in the company in the spring of 1999. In September the same year he took over as CEO, and the following month the company was renamed Overstock.com.

Byrne initiated an IPO of Overstock.com in 2002, becoming one of the first companies to go public under the "Dutch auction" method, a system advanced by WR Hambrecht + Co to retain a greater share of capital within the company rather than going to the investment bank underwriters used in conventional public offerings. Byrne has said that competing banks reacted against this, attempting to obstruct the success of the offering through negative reports and by shorting the company's stock. When Google later in 2004 went public via a Dutch auction IPO, Byrne commented that Wall Street firms similarly pushed negative stories, but did not keep it from going forward successfully. Four years after the OpenIPO, one official of Hambrecht, its now former co-CEO Clay Corbus was added to Overstock's board of directors. As a part of his role, Byrne advocated for the use of blockchain technology, including cryptocurrencies such as bitcoin.

Overstock employees, as well as Byrne's father, believed that Byrne's long-running campaign against short sellers, which began in 2005, distracted him from Overstock's core business. The company had losses in some years, and modest profits in others. Byrne's tenure was marked by a series of initiatives that were rolled out with much enthusiasm, but that were later abandoned or had disappointing outcomes. In 2004, Overstock spent several million dollars to establish an online auction platform to compete with eBay, but the project was not successful and shut down in 2011. The company also launched, and then later closed, projects in real estate, travel booking, and auto sales. He took an indefinite leave of absence from Overstock.com in April 2016 because of Hepatitis C complications, and he returned in July 2016 as CEO after his recovery. The company increasingly lost ground to other e-commerce retailers, especially Amazon and Wayfair; by the time of his resignation in 2019, Byrne had largely given up trying to compete with these larger rivals; he led, beginning in 2017, unsuccessful attempts to find a buyer for Overstock's retail business. In the late 2010s, Overstock built a new $100 million headquarters at the base of Utah's Wasatch Mountains, although several rounds of layoffs had left part of the complex empty.

In 2013, Byrne began to invest in cryptocurrency and blockchain, and Overstock became the first major retailer to accept Bitcoin as a form of payment. Byrne shifted some of Overstock's balance sheet to support Tzero, a new digital stock exchange billed as a "blockchain version of Nasdaq; Tzero's initial coin offering in 2018 was largely unsuccessful. As Bryne's focus on the technology intensified in 2017 and 2018, Overstock incurred significant losses—$316 million over two years, more than twice the profits ever made by the company.

Campaign against naked shorting and analysts
In a conference call with analysts in August 2005, Byrne said that "there's been a plan since we were in our teens to destroy our stock, drive it down to $6–$10 ... and even a plan for how the company would then get whacked up." He said that the conspirators were part of a "Miscreants Ball," headed by a "Sith Lord," whom he refused to identify but said "he's one of the master criminals from the 1980s." Byrne said the conspiracy included hedge funds, journalists, investigators, trial lawyers, the SEC, and Eliot Spitzer. Fortune writer Bethany McLean said that Byrne had become a "hero to those who believe that short-sellers are the operators of Wall Street's ultimate black box, predators who destroy companies through innuendo, bullying, political connections—and sometimes through an illegal practice known as 'naked shorting.'" Byrne financed and largely wrote a full-page advertisement in The Washington Post which said "Naked short selling ... is literally stealing money from the widows, retirees, and other small investors."  In a letter to The Wall Street Journal in April 2006, Byrne contended that "blackguards have practiced 'failure to deliver'" of securities, were "destroying businesses and (probably) destabilizing our capital markets."  Since 2005, Overstock has filed two lawsuits relating to the matters under Byrne's direction. After her article appeared in 2005, McLean was attacked by Byrne with such vehemence that she ceased covering him.

In 2005, Overstock.com sued hedge fund Rocker Partners and the equities research firm Gradient Analytics (formerly Camelback Research Alliance) in California, alleging they illegally colluded in short-selling the company while paying for negative reports to drive down share prices. Gradient countersued Overstock for libel. A portion of this suit was settled out of court in 2008; Overstock and Gradient dropped their claims against each other after Gradient retracted allegations that Overstock's reporting methods did not comply with rules established by the FASB, stated they believed Overstock.com complied with GAAP standards, and that three directors were independent, and apologized. In December 2009, the suit against Rocker, whose name had since been changed to Copper River Partners, was settled by Copper River paying $5 million.

In 2007, Overstock filed a second lawsuit against a number of large investment banks, alleging that the brokers engaged in illegal naked short selling. The long-running litigation ended in 2016. Overstock's claims against Goldman Sachs were dismissed, but the other brokers, such as Merrill Lynch, settled for $20 million.

Byrne's campaign against naked short selling and others who he feels targeted him and his company attracted both controversy and praise. In addition to criticizing broker-dealers and hedge funds as corrupt, Byrne also criticized the press as corrupt and unable to understand the financial and dot.com industries, and complained that the mainstream media had "demonized" him.

Deep Capture
In part to publicize his thoughts on naked short selling, Byrne founded the website "Deep Capture". In October 2011, Vancouver businessman Altaf Nazerali sued Byrne for libel and defamation in the Supreme Court of British Columbia for articles published on the website. The articles described Nazerali as being involved with "Osama Bin Laden's favorite financier," and that he worked with criminal syndicates including the Colombian drug cartel, the Russian mafia, and various "jihadi terrorist groups" including al Qaeda's Golden Chain. Deep Capture also accused Nazerali of "delivering weapons to war zones in Africa and to the mujahedeen in Afghanistan," of orchestrating "small-time 'pump and dump' scams… [and] bust-outs, death spiral finance and naked short selling," and of carrying out dirty work for "a Pakistani ISI asset" who "works for the Iranian regime." In May 2016, the Court found that the allegations in the Deep Capture articles were libelous and defamatory; Nazerali was awarded $1.2 million in damages, including $500,000 in aggravated damages, $250,000 in punitive damages and $55,000 in special damages. Byrne was permanently banned from publishing these accusations. The Court found Byrne, his employee Mark Mitchell, and Deep Capture "engaged in a calculated and ruthless campaign to inflict as much damage on Mr. Nazerali's reputation as they could achieve." The 102-page decision said "It is clear on the evidence that their intention was to conduct a vendetta in which the truth about Mr. Nazerali himself was of no consequence."

The judgment was upheld on appeal in August 2018.

Relationship with Maria Butina and resignation as CEO
In 2019, Byrne announced that he had had a romantic relationship with Russian agent Maria Butina and also made claims in support of a deep state conspiracy theory. Byrne also claimed the FBI encouraged him to have a sexual relationship with Butina.  Insurers' fears that Overstock could not control Byrne's "personality and public comments" ultimately led to his departure.

Byrne resigned his board seat and position as CEO of Overstock.com on August 22, 2019, after his affair with Butina was revealed; Jonathan E. Johnson served as interim CEO.

While investors had soured on Byrne's leadership and some had called for him to step down as CEO, he did not experience an activist shareholder campaign and maintained that his departure was voluntary, rather than forced by the corporation's board.

Byrne sold some of his Overstock stock over the course of 2019, but remained the company's largest shareholder in the immediate aftermath of his resignation, with a 14% stake. However, in September 2019, Byrne sold his entire stake in company (more than 4.7 million shares, about $90 million), writing on his blog that he would invest the proceeds in gold, silver, and two cryptocurrencies; criticized what he claimed to be "acts of retaliation from the Deep State"; and attacking the SEC as "the Deep State's pets."

After Butina's release from prison, she became involved in Russian national politics. Byrne continued to send her financial gifts, which in 2021 led members of the Russian political opposition to object to her running for political office based on her "foreign financial backing". The "gifts" were investigated in the US by the Business Insider, and Byrne admitted to them, when her candidacy with Vladimir Putin's party United Russia became public.

Political involvement

Pre-2020
Byrne was the largest donor to political causes in Utah during 2003–2006 (giving at least $676,500), his father Jack Byrne was the third-largest, giving (with $510,800).  Patrick Byrne was the fourth largest Utah individual donor to Republicans and the fifth largest individual Utah donor to Democrats during the time period. The father-and-son pair each gave a half-million dollars in 2004 for ads attacking Democratic vice presidential nominee John Edwards, and Patrick Byrne also gave $2,500 to Swift Vets and POWs for Truth, a group that attacked the Vietnam War service of Senator John Kerry, the 2004 Democratic presidential nominee. Nonetheless, Patrick Byrne gave $25,300 to the Utah Democratic Party, $25,000 to the Democratic Senatorial Campaign Committee, and $1,000 to Democratic congressman Jim Matheson.

Promotion of falsehoods regarding 2020 presidential election
In 2020, Byrne promoted President Donald Trump's claim that he actually won the U.S. presidential election; Trump, the Republican incumbent, was defeated by Democratic candidate Joe Biden. Along with Steve Bannon and Lin Wood, among others, Byrne was a leading figure in an assortment of allies gathered by Trump to amplify his conspiracy theory claims during his months-long effort to subvert the election results and cling to power.

Over a series of months, Byrne repeatedly promoted bizarre conspiracy claims about the 2020 election results, including in Florida, Texas, and Georgia, pushing the falsehoods at public rallies and on Twitter, variously claiming that Biden, election technology companies, China, or other foreign powers engaged in an elaborate scheme to "steal" the election.

December 2020 meeting with Trump
The Daily Beast wrote of Byrne's association with Trump that he "became one of the strangest characters of the last days of the Trump administration, visiting the White House in December, dressed in jeans and a hoodie, scarfing down meatballs, and bickering with Trump’s legal team and administration officials, as he, Flynn, and Powell together pitched the then-president on their democracy-thwarting schemes." On December 18, 2020, Byrne visited the  White House, where he met with Trump, Sidney Powell, lawyer and former Trump administration official Emily Newman, and Trump's former National Security Advisor Mike Flynn. During a meeting with Trump in the Oval Office, the four promoted their disproven fraud claims to Trump and sought to develop a plan to try to overturn Trump's election loss, which had occurred more than a month before and been formalized four days before with the Electoral College vote.

The four met Trump without the appointment appearing on Trump's private schedule, and Trump's White House staff had apparently not been informed about the meeting. After encountering opposition during their visit from some Trump officials, such as White House Counsel Pat Cipollone, Byrne later claimed that Trump's advisors were insufficiently loyal to him and were "mendacious mediocrities" who "want him to lose and are lying to him." In a Twitter post, he advised Trump and his allies to "Trust Rudy [Giuliani] and Sidney [Powell] only." Byrne said that he entered the White House on a bluff—"without any invitation"—and describing the quartet's plan as using Powell and Flynn's fame to "bullshit our way past" White House security to get to Trump. According to Byrne, he had enlisted a White House staffer's help in entering the compound, but Byrne "may have been less than clear that there would be some people with" him. During this time, Byrne had hired private jets to fly members of the Proud Boys and other members of far-right groups to Washington DC in order to engage over tactics for overturning the 2020 election.

January 2021 attack on the Capitol
Byrne was a speaker at the Trump rally on January 6 in Washington, D.C., which was directly followed by a pro-Trump mob, inflamed by Trump's false election claims, attacking the U.S. Capitol. Soon afterward, Twitter suspended Byrne's account. In July 2022, Byrne agreed to testify before Congress during the United States House Select Committee on the January 6 Attack public hearings on his role in the events leading up to the insurrection. News of the meeting led further news organizations, such as the Washington Post, to publish lengthy profiles of Byrne's election denier activities.

Republican audit of the 2020 Arizona state ballot count
In April 2021, Byrne became the leading financier of the controversial Arizona State Senate Republicans' botched audit of the presidential vote in Maricopa County, Arizona. Biden won Maricopa County (and the State of Arizona), and the result was confirmed multiple times. Nonetheless, in a bid to try to support Trump's lies about the election, the Arizona Senate's Republican leadership, led by Senate President Karen Fann, launched an audit of the county's election results, run by a small Trump-aligned company called Cyber Ninjas, which has no experience in election audits and is led by a CEO who had previously promoted the false claim that the election was rigged. The haphazard, highly politicized audit process failed to follow standard recounting procedures and was condemned by election experts, Democrats, and some Republicans, including the Republican-dominated Maricopa County Board of Supervisors, who wrote that Arizona Republicans "rented out the once-good name of the Arizona Senate" to "grifters" who were perpetrating a "sham."

Byrne claimed that he had pledged $1 million for his "Fund the Audit" campaign; The America Project, a Florida-based group of which Byrne is CEO and founder, claimed that it raised a total of $1.7 million to support the "audit," including funds sent by social media followers in support of the cause. Byrne stated that he had aspirations to spread his activities to additional counties in other states. In addition to raising money, the group helped to recruit volunteers to count ballots and coordinate with the Arizona state Senate Republicans. Jeff Flake, a former Republican U.S. Senator from Arizona, said Byrne's involvement undermined the "credibility" of the process, adding, "It's damaging to the Republican party and our system of government." In mid-September 2021, Byrne released a series of videos that outlined how he believed that Biden should step down and be replaced by a coalition of individuals led by Michael Flynn, despite his conviction for lying to the FBI, effectively replacing President Biden with Flynn as the leader of the United States.

In late September 2021, the results of the ballot count were released, showing that Biden did indeed win the county - with a potentially larger margin than originally counted. Following the release of the report, Byrne doubled down on trying to find other reasons to keep his conspiracy theory afloat, as NBC News published that Byrne was profiting from the continued false accusations of election insecurity.

Financing and promoting  claims in blog, books, media, organizations, and film
In 2021, Byrne self-published his book The Deep Rig: How Election Fraud Cost Donald J. Trump the White House, By a Man Who Did Not Vote for Him, which details his experience promoting his various electoral conspiracy theories. The book, largely compiled of text copied-and-pasted from Byrne's blog, was hastily produced, with the print version including hyperlinks and embedded video not useful in the paper printed format.

Byrne urged election-fraud believers to sign up to pay him $5 per month, in credit-card recurring charges, to view his social media posts about what he claimed to be "insider knowledge"; this could bring Byrne up to $1.15 million annually in subscription fees.

During the audit in Maricopa County, Arizona, Byrne funded a documentary film, The Deep Rig, created by director Roger R. Richards, to promote his 2020 election-related falsehoods. Richards was previously known for films promoting fantastical claims, such as the belief that the September 11 attacks were caused by a conspiracy by extraterrestrial aliens. Byrne is the key figure in the film, which features interviews from various other conspiracy theorists. The film, based partially on Byrne's self-published book, has also been promoted by fellow conspiracy theorist Mike Lindell, who teamed up with Byrne in 2021 in order to push their respective election theories in concert. The reported budget for the film was $750,000, and the streaming cost for the film was between $45 and $500 per view, which resulted in Rachel Maddow commenting that Byrne "seems to be making a ton of money on that" as well. The film premiered at the Dream City Church megachurch in Phoenix, Arizona, where Byrne spoke alongside the director and, according to The New Yorker, "a local QAnon conspiracist, BabyQ, who claimed to be receiving messages from his future self." The Washington Post stated that the film encouraged right-wing media outlets and social media accounts to promote election denial on behalf of Trump.

 Byrne promoted his election-related falsehoods on pro-Trump far-right outlets such as One America News Network and Newsmax, which attracted viewers and readers by their willingness to go further than Fox News in promoting Trump's bid to subvert the election result.

Byrne's leadership of the "American Project" reflected his growing influence on the Trumpist right, with the organization playing a major role, in conjunction with other right-wing groups, in promoting election disinformation. Byrne was also the CEO of "Defending the Republic," a fundraising organization founded by Powell that purported to raise funds to fight for "election integrity" but was used instead to Powell's personal  legal bills to support her defense against a  $1.3 billion defamation suit filed against Powell by Dominion Voting Systems in connection with her promotion of conspiracy theories. In August 2021, Byrne was then added to the defamation lawsuit alongside far-right news outlets OAN and Newsmax filed by Dominion, linking the defamation to Byrne's own pushing of election lies. In the suit, Dominion stated that Byrne had decided that the election "would be stolen" months ahead of the 2020 contest. Byrne and the two news outlets were sued for $1.73 billion each.

In 2022, PBS reported that Byrne had been informed that several of the persons he promoted as stating that Trump was defrauded were lying, but that he chose to promote their words anyways. He also told a reporter from PBS that he "could live with" potentially "destroying the country", referring to the United States. During the 2022 Midterm Elections, Byrne was a major donor to candidates that ran on the premise that the 2020 election was not legitimate. Following the election, he again financed efforts by candidates to overturn their lost election bids, including Kari Lake.

Anti-vaccination beliefs
In the context of his election conspiracy theories, Byrne has also written posts pushing alternative cures to COVID-19 and questioning the role of vaccines on his blog Deep Capture. He has stated that COVID-19 vaccines were either "poisoning Americans" or "putting miniature Covid-19 spike protein factories in our arms to wreak havoc with ovaries and balls". Both claims have been proven false by the medical community. On the same blog, Byrne insisted that the vaccine push has its "origin in political decisions made in Washington, DC," and " little to do with what is best for the health of Americans, and everything to do with political considerations of a regime that came to power in a rigged election." In September 2021, Byrne became a part of a travelling anti-vaccination touring group called the "Reawaken America" tour that also featured Flynn and Lindell. Byrne travelled with the group to multiple US states with a message that COVID-19 was not a threat and that treatment of it was unhealthy—again something long disproven by actual medical doctors. Admission to their events ran between $250 and US$500 per person.

Education policy
In 2005, Byrne provided financial backing to the Class Education, whose goal is to change state laws to require schools to spend at least 65 percent of their operating budgets on classroom expenses. Proponents of the standard contend that it would free up money to increase teachers' salaries without requiring tax increases. Critics say that many services deemed "non-classroom" are necessary for education, including librarians, school nurses, guidance counselors, food service workers and school bus drivers.

Byrne also serves as co-chair (with Rose Friedman) of EdChoice. The non-profit organization was founded by Milton and Rose Friedman and promotes school vouchers and other forms of school choice.

Byrne and his family contributed most of the funds in support of House Bill 148 in Utah, a bill that would allow the state to provide funding vouchers for students who decide to leave public schools for private schools. In January 2008, it was reported that Byrne and his parents contributed about $4 million to the pro-voucher campaign, or three-quarters of its $5.4 million funding and equal the entire total spent by the opposing side. When that bill was defeated in a statewide referendum (62% opposing vs. 38% favoring), the Salt Lake Tribune reported that Byrne "called the referendum a 'statewide IQ test' that Utahns failed." He said, "They don't care enough about their kids. They care an awful lot about this system, this bureaucracy, but they don't care enough about their kids to think outside the box."

Byrne criticized Utah governor Jon Huntsman for not sufficiently supporting the voucher campaign. Huntsman had before he was elected stated that he was "going to be the voucher governor", and Byrne had donated $75,000 to Huntsman's campaign for governor in 2004. When Huntsman was elected, however, he went missing from the debate, and Byrne told the Associated Press that he would now bankroll anyone who could defeat Huntsman at the polls, "even a communist".

Personal life
Shortly after his graduation from Dartmouth, Byrne suffered from testicular cancer; he recovered, but several bouts of the cancer left him hospitalized for much of his 20s. He holds a black belt in taekwondo. He also owns several homes in Sarasota, Florida, which he purchased through a ghost company called Manatee Investments LLC.

References

External links
 Deep Capture

1962 births
Living people
American retail chief executives
Dartmouth College alumni
Marshall Scholars
Stanford University alumni
American conspiracy theorists
People from Fort Wayne, Indiana
Alumni of King's College, Cambridge
Beijing Normal University alumni